Bharadvaja (also spelled Bharadwaja) was one of the revered Vedic sages
(maharishi) in Ancient India. He was a renowned scholar, economist, grammarian and physician. He is one of the Saptarishis (seven great sages or Maharṣis).

His contributions to ancient Indian literature, specifically the  Rigveda, provide significant insight into ancient Indian society. He and his family of students were the authors of the sixth book of the Rigveda. In the epic Mahabharata, Bharadvaja was the father of the teacher (guru) Droṇācārya, the instructor to Pandava and Kaurava princes. Bharadwaja is also mentioned in Charaka Samhita, an authoritative ancient Indian medical text.

Etymology
The word Bharadvaja is a compound Sanskrit from "bhara(d) and vaja(m)", which together mean "bringing about nourishment". the name also lends itself to more than one yoga asana called Bharadvajasana (“nourishing pose”) named after the sage.

Description
His full name in Vedic texts is Bharadvaja Barhaspatya, the last name referring to his father and Vedic deity-sage Brihaspati. His mother was Mamata, wife of Utathya Rishi who was the elder brother of Barhaspati. In the Bhagavata Purana, he is named as Vitatha  He is one of the seven rishis mentioned four times in the Rigveda as well as in the Shatapatha Brahmana, thereafter revered in the Mahabharata and the Puranas. In some later Puranic legends, he is stated to be the son of Vedic sage Atri.

In Buddhist Pali canonical texts such as Digha Nikaya, Tevijja Sutta describes a discussion between the Buddha and Vedic scholars of his time. The Buddha names ten rishis, calls them "early sages" and makers of ancient verses that have been collected and chanted in his era, and among those ten rishis is Bharadvaja.

The ancient Hindu medical treatise Charaka Samhita attributes Bharadvaja learning medical sciences from god Indra, after pleading that "poor health was disrupting the ability of human beings from pursuing their spiritual journey", and then Indra provides both the method and specifics of medical knowledge.

Bharadvaja is considered to be the initiator of the Bharadvāja gotra of the Brahmin, Khatris, Kayastha and Bhumihar caste. Bharadvaja is the third in the row of the Pravara Rishis (Aangirasa, Barhaspatya, Bharadvaja) and is the first in the Bharadvaja Gotris, with the other two rishis also being initiators of Gotras with their respective names.

Texts
Bharadvaja and his family of students are 55. Bharadvaja and his family of students were the traditional poets of king Marutta of the Vedic era, in the Hindu texts.

Bharadvaja is a revered sage in the Hindu traditions, and like other revered sages, numerous treatises composed in the ancient and medieval eras are reverentially named after him. Some treatises named after him or attributed to him include:
 Dhanur-veda, credited to Bharadvaja in chapter 12.203 of the Mahabharata, is an Upaveda treatise on archery.
 Bharadvaja samhita, a Pancharatra text (an Agama text of Vaishnavism).
 Bharadvaja srautasutra and grhyasutra, a ritual and rites of passage text from first millennium BCE. After the Kalpasutra by Baudhayana, these Bharadvaja texts are among the oldest srauta and grhya sutras known.
 Sections in Ayurveda. Bharadvaja theories on medicine and causal phenomenon is described in Charaka Samhita. Bharadvaja states, for example, that an embryo is not caused by wish, prayers, urging of mind or mystical causes, but it is produced from the union of a man's sperm and menstrual blood of a woman at the right time of her menstrual cycle, in her womb. According to Gerrit Jan Meulenbeld, Bharadvaja is credited with many theories and practical ideas in ancient Indian medicine.
 Niti sastra, a treatise on ethics and practical conduct.
 Bharadvaja-siksa, is one of many ancient Sanskrit treatises on phonetics.

Epics and Puranic scriptures

According to one legend, Bharadvaja married Susheela and had a son named Garga and a daughter named Devavarshini. According to some other legends, Bharadvaja had two daughters named Ilavida and Katyayani, who married Vishrava and Yajnavalkya respectively. According to Vishnu Purana, Bharadwaja had a brief liaison with an apsara named Ghritachi, and together they had a child who grew up into a warrior-Brahmin named Droṇācārya. In the Mahabharata, Drona is instead born when Bharadwaja ejaculated his semen in a pot. Bharadwaja is therefore directly linked to two important characters of the epic Mahabharata — Dronacharya and Aśvatthāma, the son of Dronacharya. According to the Mahabharata, Bharadvaja trained Drona in the use of weapons. Bharadwaja had two disciples: Agnivesa and Drupada. Agnivesa taught Drona the mastery of the weapon Agneya, while Drupada became the king of Panchala kingdom.

One legend in the Mahabharata states that King Bharata adopted Bharadvaja as his son when he was delivered to the king by the Marutas. Bharadvaja married a kshatriya woman named Susheela. According to the Bhagavata Purana, Bharadvaja beget a son named Manyu also known as Bhumanyu while in the Mahabharata Bhumanyu is born to him by yagnas.

Rāmāyaṇa
In the epic Ramayana, Rama, Sita and Lakshmana meet Bharadvaja at his ashrama (hermitage) at the start of their fourteen-year exile. The sage asks them to stay with him through the exile, but they insist on going deeper into the forest to Chitrakuta, which was three krosha away from the ashram. Bharadvaja gives them directions. Bharata is received at the ashrama by Bharadvaja when attempted to locate Rama in order to bring Sita, Lakshmana, and him back to Ayodhya. He reappears at various times in the epic. According to James Lochtefeld, the Bharadvaja in the Ramayana is different from the Vedic sage mentioned in Panini's Ashtadhyayi.

Notes

References

Bibliography
 

Brahmin gotras
Hindu sages
Rishis
Characters in the Mahabharata
Sages in the Ramayana
Saptarishi